The 1986 Grand Prix motorcycle racing season was the 38th F.I.M. Road Racing World Championship season.

This would be the last season where the premier class was held only in Europe until 2020.

Season summary
A second world championship for the consistent Eddie Lawson. After a dominating 1985 season, the future looked bright for Honda's Freddie Spencer. However, once the season started, he began to suffer from carpal tunnel syndrome. The talented American would never win another Grand Prix after his spectacular 1985 season. Australian Wayne Gardner stepped up to become Honda's lead rider. Randy Mamola, riding for the newly formed Kenny Roberts-Yamaha team continued to post good results and finished third in the points chase.

Venezuelan Carlos Lavado earned his second world championship for Yamaha with a strong performance. Garelli teammates Fausto Gresini and Luca Cadalora battled it out for the 125 title, each taking four wins with Cadalora coming out on top. Spain's Jorge Martinez ended Stefan Dörflinger's streak of title wins at four. Angel Nieto announced he was retiring after twenty-three years in Grand Prix racing. He continued to be competitive up to the end with a second-place finish in the Italian 125 race and a second in Spain in the 80cc class. His 90 Grand Prix victories at the time ranked him second only to Giacomo Agostini.

For 125cc and 80cc, an additional post-season event on the Hockenheimring (located in the German state of Baden-Württemberg) was designated as the Baden-Württemberg Grand Prix and counted towards the championships in these classes.

1986 Grand Prix season calendar
The following Grands Prix were scheduled to take place in 1986:

Calendar changes
 The South African Grand Prix was boycotted due to the Apartheid policies in the country.
 The German Grand Prix moved from the Hockenheimring to the Nürburgring.
 The French Grand Prix moved from the Bugatti Circuit in Le Mans to the Paul Ricard circuit.
 The Baden-Württemberg motorcycle Grand Prix was added as a one-off race to replace the South African Grand Prix. Only the 80cc and 125cc participated in this race.

Results and standings

Grands Prix

Participants

500cc participants

250cc participants

500cc riders' standings

Scoring system
Points are awarded to the top ten finishers. A rider has to finish the race to earn points.
 

{|
|

250cc standings

125cc standings

80cc standings

Further reading
 Büla, Maurice & Schertenleib, Jean-Claude (2001). Continental Circus 1949-2000. Chronosports S.A.

References

External links

Grand Prix motorcycle racing seasons
Grand Prix motorcycle racing season